The Churigar are a Muslim community found in the state of Rajasthan in India and the Punjab province of Pakistan.

Origin 
Their name means a manufacturer of bangles, from the Urdu churi bangle and gar maker. The Churigar are found mainly in the districts of Bhilwara, Chittorgarh, Pali, Jodhpur and Udaipur in Rajasthan. Historically, the Churigar were also found in Hissar, Rohtak and Gurgaon in what is now Haryana, as well as in the districts Gujrat, Sialkot, Mandi Bahaudin and Sargodha in Pakistan. The Churigar were nomadic community, one of the many gypsy like groups found in Rajasthan and Haryana. By the middle of the 19th century, groups of Churigar had begun to migrate to villages in the Punjab, selling jewellery and bangles. At the time of the partition of India in 1947, almost all of those in Haryana immigrated to Pakistan.

In Rajasthan, the Churigar speak Mewari among themselves and Hindi with outsiders. Those who have attended Islamic madrasas also understand Urdu. Like most Muslim artisan castes, the Churigar claim a Middle Eastern and in particular an Arab origin. However, it is likely that they also incorporate converts from similar status Hindu castes of Rajasthan.

Present circumstances

In India 
The community is strictly endogamous, and practice both parallel cousin and cross cousin marriages. They are further divided into three clans, the Multani, the Shaikh and the Sayyid. Traditionally, the Sayyid Churigar did not intermarry with the other two clans, but this is no longer the case. 

The Churigar in Rajasthan are now settled in villages, occupying their own distinct quarters. Bangle making is still the traditional occupation of the Churigar, and they are mainly landless. Many are also employed as daily wage labourers.

In Pakistan 
As nomads, the Punjab Churigar tend to establish regular relations with client communities in villages, and follow specific routes of migration. The basic social unit of the Churigar is the puki or tent in the Punjabi. All members of the pukki are blood relations, and marriage is within this group. The Churigar still speak a dialect of Punjabi with many Rajasthani loanwords. The origin of Churigar is from chura made from ivory (Hathi Daant), as churi was initially made from Hathi Daant for Shahi Khandan are a very precious item. Churigar is not a cast its name from the trade or manufacturing of Churi. Sahiwal a Tehsil of District Sargodga and District Jhang near Sargodha was very famous in Chura making from ivory. Main group of cast involve in this business were Khokhar, Awan, and Hashmi families in Sargodha District. With the passage of time, Churigar business declined due to the heavy cost of Ivory.

See also 
Manihar

References 

Muslim communities of Rajasthan
Social groups of Rajasthan
Muslim communities of India
Social groups of Punjab, Pakistan